Tighennif is a town and commune in Mascara Province, Algeria. According to the 2002 census it has a population of 55,800.

Personalities
Ternifine or Tighennif is the home of a fossil human jawbone dating to the Middle Pleistocene, which French vertebrate paleontologist Camille Arambourg classified as Atlantanthropus mauritanicus in 1955.
Charles Guillaume Marie Appollinaire Antoine Cousin Montauban, comte de Palikao is a famous person associated with Tighennif.
Henri Akoka French-Algerian clarinetist.

References

Communes of Mascara Province